The Wharncliffe Viaduct is a brick-built viaduct that carries the Great Western Main Line railway across the Brent Valley, between Hanwell and Southall, Ealing, UK, at an elevation of . The viaduct, built in 1836–7, was constructed for the opening of the Great Western Railway (GWR). It is situated between Southall and Hanwell stations, the latter station being only a very short distance away to the east.

The viaduct was the first major structural design by Isambard Kingdom Brunel, the first building contract to be let on the GWR project, and the first major engineering work to be completed. It was also the first railway viaduct to be built with hollow piers, a feature much appreciated by a colony of bats which has since taken up residence within.

Design
Constructed of engineering brick, the  viaduct has eight semi-elliptical arches, each spanning  and rising . The supporting piers are hollow and tapered, rising to projecting stone cornices that held up the arch centring during construction.

The contractor was the partnership of Thomas Grissell and Samuel Morton Peto. The cost was £40,000. The foundation works were carried out by William Brotherhood and his son Rowland. The young Charles Richardson also worked here under Brunel, as one of his first works for the Great Western.

As travel by rail became more popular and rail traffic grew, pressure mounted to have an additional local line. Also, the Gauge Act of 1846 decreed that George Stephenson's (narrower) standard gauge should be the standard used for all railways across the country. Therefore, in 1877 the viaduct was widened by the addition of an extra row of piers and arches on the north side. Then in 1892 the broad gauge track was converted to standard gauge, and this allowed enough width for four standard gauge tracks.

On the central pier on the south side is a carving of the coat of arms of James Stuart Wortley Mackenzie, Lord Wharncliffe, who was chairman of the parliamentary committee that steered the passage of the GWR Bill through Parliament.

First viaduct to carry telegraph

Brunel was quick to see the possible advantages of the early electric telegraph system for use in running the railway. In 1838 he persuaded Sir Charles Wheatstone and William Fothergill Cooke to install their five-needle telegraph system between Paddington Station and West Drayton and to carry out experiments. It proved to be useful, so the viaduct thus carried the world's first commercial electrical telegraph, on 9 April 1839.

At first, the seven-core cables were carried inside cast iron pipes, on short wooden spikes, a few feet from the side of the railway line. But from January 1843, the public were treated to the sight of telegraph wires against the sky line, across the top of the viaduct, for the first time. Cooke had renegotiated the contract with the GWR and extended the telegraph to Slough, using a simpler two-needle instrument that could be supplied with just two wires suspended from porcelain insulators on poles.

On 16 May 1843 the Paddington-to-Slough telegraph went public, becoming Britain's first public telegraph service. Despite being something of a publicity stunt for Cooke, it became very popular, and HM Government were frequently using it for communication with the royal household at Windsor Castle nearby.

In early 1845, John Tawell was apprehended following the use of a needle telegraph message from Slough to Paddington on 1 January 1845. This is thought to be the first use of the telegraph to catch a murderer.

The message was:
A murder has just been committed at Salt Hill and the suspected murderer was seen to take a first class ticket to London by the train that left Slough at 7.42pm. He is in the garb of a Kwaker with a brown great coat on which reaches his feet. He is in the last compartment of the second first-class carriage

As the telecommunication traffic grew, the viaduct came to carry one of the trunk routes for the transatlantic cables, and more recently fibre-optic cables.

Public recognition
The viaduct was among the first structures to be listed, being defined as a Grade 1 listed building on 8 November 1949 (the legal framework for listing was introduced in 1947).

Sir Nikolaus Pevsner, CBE, the historian of art and architecture, said of it, "Few viaducts have such architectural panache."

It is one of the key locations in the bid for historic parts of the original GWR main line from Paddington to be recognised as a World Heritage Site.

On the nearby Uxbridge Road, an eighteenth-century coaching inn was renamed The Viaduct in its honour when the railway opened. This pub, which is itself listed as of local interest, still contains parts of the original stable block.

Bat colony

The hollow cavities within the structure of the supporting piers provide convenient roosting places for bats. These 'bat caves' have been given legal protection under the Countryside Act (1981). Bats are vulnerable to disturbance and the Act requires that only trained and licensed bat-workers may enter caves and other areas where bats roost.

The Parks and Countryside Service of the London Borough of Ealing, in conjunction with Network Rail and the London Bat Group, have worked to safeguard the colonies by providing entrance grilles and hibernation shelters for each roost.

It is not clear which species of bat is resident; indeed, there may be several. Identification usually requires capture and expert knowledge. However, the most likely candidate is Daubenton's bat, since this species forms colonies in caves, tunnels and under bridges, always near water (in this case, the River Brent), and is known to reside in other locations in west London.

It is quite likely that this viaduct is the largest bat cave complex in the whole of London, and possibly the south of England, as no other roost approaching this size has so far been reported.

Since 2016, surveying by Ealing Wildlife Group, the park ranger team and a licensed bat ecologist have shed some more light on whether the viaduct is actually as important for bats as once speculated. While the hollow viaduct piers may be some of the largest potential spaces in London for bats to use as roosting sites, that doesn't necessarily mean the largest roost of bats in London reside here.  Seven species of bat have now been recorded in Ealing, at least 4 in the vicinity of the viaduct. 

Most commonly seen hunting around the viaduct and appearing to emerge from it are Soprano and Common Pipistrelles. Occasional Noctule bats are detected over Brent Lodge Park but these are tree cavity specialists so unlikely to roost within the viaduct.  Most notably, a single Brown Long Eared Bat was observed during a licensed roost inspection hibernating under one of the shelters attached to the interior of the viaduct. This is a scarce species in London and has also been recorded using electronic bat detecting equipment along the tree line underneath the viaduct as well as in nearby Boles Meadow at the far side of Brent Lodge Park. It may be that the viaduct is an important hibernation roost site for this species locally. The single bat recorded was late in the hibernation season, so it would be worthwhile doing further surveys in the middle of winter to determine if there are more bats and further species present. 

Daubenton's bats have so far not been detected near the viaduct, but occasionally nearby on the Grand Union Canal and at Osterley Park. The other species detected in Ealing are Leisler's Bats, also scarce in London and the migratory Nathusius' Pipistrelle which uses the Thames Valley as a migration route into the UK and Ireland from its wintering grounds in Eastern Europe. 

Whether there were ever notably large numbers of bats using these so called 'bat caves' in the past, there don't appear to be now. One theory is that conditions are now less favourable within the viaduct for bat hibernation at least. As winter temperatures have risen or become more variable, and as vegetation has grown it's likely that ventilation and conditions have changed within the hollow piers and they no longer maintain as stable or low a temperature as they once did, making them less suitable for a mass bat hibernation roost site. It's hoped that future support from Network Rail and collaborative efforts between the rangers and Ealing Wildlife Group can investigate this and improve conditions for bats in the viaduct once more.

Location
The Wharncliffe Viaduct is best viewed from Brent Meadow on the south side, accessed from the Uxbridge Road, opposite Ealing Hospital. This is an area being maintained as a traditional hay meadow and is part of the Brent River Park.

The river Brent has marked the boundary between Hanwell and Southall since before the Domesday Book.

Time line
1836

A large body of Irish men engaged in constructing the Great Western Railway went to The Stag beerhouse, where a few Englishmen had assembled, and a row commenced. Hearing that the Rev. Dr. Walmisley, the rector, had dispatched a messenger to Brentford for the police, their rage was diverted to that worthy magistrate, whom they threatened to sacrifice to their fury. Three prisoners were sentenced to two months in the House of Correction by the magistrates, who sent a letter to the Company, and stated that unless something was done, it would be necessary to apply to the Government for a body of police or military, to be stationed at Hanwell.

3 May 1838

First trains run. The first locomotives to cross were the Vulcan and the Aeolus built by Tayleur and Co., of Warrington and the more famous North Star, built by Robert Stephenson and Company at Newcastle-upon-Tyne.

4 June 1838

The line opened to the public.

1839

Trains on the new railway left Hanwell for Paddington every morning at 8 and 11 am, and at 3 and 7 pm; also westwards for Slough and Maidenhead, at 9:30 am, and at 1:30, 4:30, and 8:30 pm.

Locally, it is often repeated to this day, that Queen Victoria so much enjoyed the view that she would have her train halt for a while on Brunel's spectacular viaduct over the river Brent.

1847

The engine of an Exeter Express lost a tyre from a  drive wheel, near Southall. It killed two passers-by and derailed a goods train on the other track. As this happened at high speed, the express was unable to stop until it had passed over the Wharncliffe Viaduct.

Second World War

With the industrial base of Britain being so dependent on its railway system, the viaduct was considered a strategic target by the Germans. Local people still remember the many attempts made by the Luftwaffe to destroy the viaduct. Had they succeeded, it would have severed the arterial link into and out of the West London industrial estates for many weeks – if not months. All raids, however, fell wide of their mark or the bombs failed to explode.

24 November 2002

The train remained upright but travelled a further , passing an oncoming High Speed Train, through Hanwell station, and over Wharncliffe Viaduct before coming to a halt. There were no injuries to the 450 passengers on board, but the driver had to be treated for shock.

See also
River Brent
List of bridges in London
List of railway bridges and viaducts in the United Kingdom

References

External links

 
 "Wharncliffe Viaduct, John Bourne, 1845" – drawing commissioned by the GWR for a book of stations and railway infrastructure.
  The London Bat Group Accessed 2007-06-18
 Photo of grille preventing human access to bat roosts
 Photo of information board under the viaduct.

Railway viaducts in London
Grade I listed buildings in the London Borough of Ealing
Grade I listed railway bridges and viaducts
Great Western Railway
Great Western Main Line
Bridges by Isambard Kingdom Brunel